"Inspector Sands" is a code phrase used by public transport authorities in the United Kingdom, including Network Rail and London Underground, to alert staff to a fire alarm without needing to evacuate the station. The exact wording depends on the station and the nature of the incident. For example: "Would Inspector Sands, please report to the operations room immediately." or "Would Inspector Sands, please report to Platform 2."

The automated public address announcement can be generated automatically by the station's fire warning system, or can be triggered from the station control. The message audio file is usually stored as the primary standard emergency announcement on the station PA/VA system. Fire alarms in small buildings automatically activate all fire sounders to instruct occupants to evacuate the building whereas larger public buildings such as railway stations require a staged evacuation procedure to avoid false alarms. The message may indicate that a single fire alarm call point in a public area has been activated and which needs to be corroborated by a station staff before a decision is made whether to evacuate the whole station.

If an automatic fire detector in a non-public area is operated, or more than one device or zone reports a fire, the system will start the evacuation procedure and the fire brigade is automatically called. The announcement can be triggered by the station controller to alert station staff of other incidents which need urgent attention. The automated nature of the announcement and its high priority means that it has occasionally been known to cut into manual (lower priority) announcements being made by station staff. On some railway stations the announcement is also triggered during the routine testing of alarm systems.

History 
The code phrase "Mr. Sands" was used in theatres, where sand buckets were used to put out fires, as a code for fire. The word "fire" backstage would cause alarm to either performers or the audience.

See also

References

Disasters on the London Underground
London Underground
Network Rail